Lassana Touré (born July 30, 1980 in Vitry-sur-Seine, France) is a French basketball player who played 21 games for French Pro A league club Roanne during the 2004-2005 season.

External links
 Ligue Nationale de Basket profile

References

French men's basketball players
1980 births
Living people